Maria Shvarnovna (c. 1158  - 19 March/19 May 1205/1206) was the first wife of Vsevolod III Big Nest, and gave birth to at least 14 children (hence Vsevolod's sobriquet of "Big Nest").  Four of her sons, Konstantin, George, Yaroslav and Sviatoslav, succeeded their father as Grand Princes of Vladimir, and Yaroslav went on to become Grand Prince of Kiev around the time of the Mongol Invasion.  As Yaroslav's mother, she is thus the paternal grandmother of Alexander Nevsky, whose son, Daniel of Moscow, founded the Muscovite branch of the Rurikid Dynasty.

Maria's origins are disputed. Some sources say she was Ossetian or Alan and connected to the Georgian royal house, while others, such as the Uspensky Sbornik (a 13th-century text now housed in the Russian State Museum in Moscow), say she was Moravian.  M. V. Shchepkina posited the idea that the Sbornik was compiled for Maria in 1199–1206, and thus the claims that she was Moravian might be more believable than the other claims, but Caucasian chronicles claim Vsevolod traveled to Tbilisi in 1170 (from Constantinople), where he was married to Maria at the suggestion of the Georgian King. The date of her death is also uncertain, as 19 March 1205 is also given in some accounts.  The Novgorod First Chronicle mentions her death under the year 1205, but does not give an exact day.  As it is mentioned after her son Konstantin's arrival in Novgorod on March 20, it would seem she died after that, perhaps in May.

Maria is venerated as a saint by the Russian Orthodox Church and is credited with founding several convents, most notably the Convent of the Assumption, known as the Princess's Convent in Vladimir on the Kliazma.  According to several accounts, the convent was founded in 1200 and Maria took the schema and the name Marfa (although this would have required her to have ended her marriage with Vsevolod, who outlived her by six years). She and her sister, Anna, were buried in the convent and her relics, along with those of several other saints, including Alexander Nevsky's first wife, Princess Alexandra, and his daughter are still kept there.

Children

Maria and Vsevolod the Big Nest had at least 14 children:

Sbislava Vsevolodovna (born 26 October 1178).
Vseslava Vsevolodovna. (died c. 1206) Married Rostislav Yaroslavich, Prince of Snov. He was a son of Yaroslav II Vsevolodovich, Prince of Chernigov. His paternal grandfather was Vsevolod II of Kiev.
Verchuslava Vsevolodovna. (born 1181) Married Rostislav II of Kiev. 
Konstantin of Rostov (18 May 1186 – 2 February 1218)
Boris Vsevolodovich. (c. 1188 – 1238)
Gleb Vsevolodovich (died 29 September 1189)
Yuri II of Vladimir (1189 – 4 March 1238)
Yaroslav II of Vladimir (8 February 1191 – 30 September 1246)
Yelena Vsevolodovna (died after 1206)
Vladimir Vsevolodovich, Prince of Yuryev-Polsky (25 October 1194 – 6 January 1229)
Sviatoslav III of Vladimir (27 March 1196 – 3 February 1252)
Ivan Vsevolodovich, Prince of Starodub (28 November 1197 – after 1247)
Pelagea Vsevolodovna
Anna Vsevolodovna. Married Vladimir, Prince of Belgorod (died 1239)

References

12th-century births
1205 deaths
Kievan Rus' princesses
Christian saints
12th-century Rus' people